Krzysztof Jan Kozlowski (18 August 1931 – 26 March 2013) was a Polish journalist and politician. He served as Poland's Minister of the former Interior and Administration with the Cabinet of Prime Minister Tadeusz Mazowiecki from 1990 until 1991. (The single ministry was split into two separate ministries in 2011). Kozlowski also served as the first Chief of the Urząd Ochrony Państwa (UOP) from 1990 to 1992 and was elected to the Senate of the Republic of Poland for four terms.

Born in 1931 in Przybysławice, Gmina Gołcza, Kozlowski died from heart failure in Kraków on 26 March 2013, at the age of 81.

References

1931 births
2013 deaths
People from Miechów County
People from Kielce Voivodeship (1919–1939)
Democratic Union (Poland) politicians
Freedom Union (Poland) politicians
Interior ministers of Poland
Members of the Senate of Poland 1989–1991
Members of the Senate of Poland 1991–1993
Members of the Senate of Poland 1993–1997
Members of the Senate of Poland 1997–2001
Polish journalists
Polish Round Table Talks participants
Academic staff of the John Paul II Catholic University of Lublin
John Paul II Catholic University of Lublin alumni
Burials at Salwator Cemetery